Robert A. Kindler is the Global Head of Mergers and Acquisitions and Vice Chairman of Morgan Stanley. He also is on the Management Committee at Morgan Stanley.  He graduated magna cum laude from Colgate University (majoring in romantic poetry and music) in 1976 and then New York University School of Law in 1980.

He has endowed professorships at both Colgate University and New York University School of Law. He was a Trustee of Colgate University for 13 years and is on the Board of the New York University School of Law and Revenue Chair at The March of Dimes.

Career 
Kindler began his career in 1980 as an associate at Cravath Swaine & Moore and became a partner in 1987.  He joined JPMorgan in 2000 and was global head of mergers and acquisition.  He joined Morgan Stanley in 2006.

During the financial crisis of 2007–2008, MUFG Bank, Japan's largest bank, invested $9 billion in a direct purchase of a 21% ownership stake in Morgan Stanley on September 29, 2008. The payment from MUFG was supposed to be wired electronically; however, because it needed to be made on an emergency basis on Columbus Day when banks were closed in the US, MUFG cut a US$9 billion physical check, the largest amount written via physical check at the time. The physical check was accepted at the offices of Wachtell Lipton by Robert, on behalf of Morgan Stanley.

Personal 

Kindler's brother is comedian Andy Kindler.

References 

Living people
American business executives
Cravath, Swaine & Moore partners
Colgate University alumni
New York University School of Law alumni
Morgan Stanley employees
Year of birth missing (living people)